Jean-Claude Schindelholz (born 11 October 1940) was a Swiss football striker.

Career
Born in Moutier, Schindelholz began playing football with FC Moutier's first team at age 17, and would help the club gain promotion to the Nationalliga B in 1962. During his career he achieved 13 caps and 1 goal for Switzerland between 15 April 1964 and 22 October 1966. He also played in Switzerland's 0–5 loss to West Germany at the 1966 World Cup.

On the club level he played for FC Moutier, Servette FC (1963–1971) and Vevey-Sports (1971–1973).

References

1940 births
Living people
Swiss men's footballers
Servette FC players
Switzerland international footballers
1966 FIFA World Cup players
Association football forwards